Brushy Creek is a stream in northwest Henry County in the U.S. state of Missouri. It is a tributary of Big Creek.

The headwaters arise about two miles northeast of Creighton (at ) and the stream flows to the east-northeast about three miles.  The confluence with Big Creek is about 1.5 miles south of Blairstown (at ).

Brushy Creek was so named on account of brush lining its course.

See also
List of rivers of Missouri

References

Rivers of Henry County, Missouri
Rivers of Missouri